Slaughter and May is an international law firm headquartered in Bunhill Row, London. Founded in 1889, Slaughter and May is considered to be one of the most prestigious law firms in the world and is a member of the "Magic Circle" of elite London-headquartered law firms. In addition to London, it has offices in Beijing, Brussels and Hong Kong.

History 
Slaughter and May was founded on 1 January 1889 by William Capel Slaughter and William May. The firm's first office was located at 18 Austin Friars in the City of London. In 1974, the firm opened an office in Hong Kong, being the first London law firm to establish a presence there. During the 1980s and 1990s, the firm acted on a number of privatisations in the United Kingdom, including those of British Airways, British Gas and British Steel Corporation.

In 2002, Slaughter and May moved to its current London office at One Bunhill Row. Slaughter and May closed its New York office in September 2004 and its Singapore office in October 2004, instead referring its U.S. work to Wall Street firms and its Southeast Asia work to the Australian firm of Allens Arthur Robinson. In December 2005, Slaughter and May agreed to cede its Paris office to the French law firm Bredin Prat. In 2009, the firm opened an office in Beijing, China, to focus mainly on M&A and outbound and inbound investment.

In comparison to the other Magic Circle firms, Slaughter and May has a minimal overseas presence. Its international practice largely relies on relationships with local law firms in other countries, many of which themselves have minimal overseas presence, and thus do not compete with Slaughter and May. These closely associated firms have included Clayton Utz, Corrs Chambers Westgarth and Gilbert + Tobin in Australia; Bell Gully in New Zealand; BonelliErede, Bredin Prat, De Brauw Blackstone Westbroek, Hengeler Mueller and Uría Menéndez in continental Europe; Shin & Kim and Kim & Chang in South Korea; and three of the Big Four law firms in Japan.

Operations
In 2015 its partners earned the highest profit per equity partner (PEP) of any UK law firm. 
 
In 2015, the firm represented 33 clients on the FTSE 100 and 44 clients on the FTSE 250, more than any other firm at the time, including governments, entrepreneurs, funds to leading banks, retailers, entertainment companies, industrial conglomerates and professional sports clubs.

In London, Hong Kong and Beijing, Slaughter and May's core practice areas are mergers and acquisitions, corporate and financing work.

In Brussels, its practice areas are competition, financial regulation, data protection, as well as trade issues raised by Brexit.

Carillion collapse 
In May 2018, a report by a joint inquiry of members of the UK parliament criticized the firm for billing more than £8 million for legal advice to Carillion from when its dire financial position became clear in May 2017 to its eventual collapse in January 2018. Members of parliament said that "names such as Slaughter and May, Lazard, Morgan Stanley and EY were brandished by the board as a badge of credibility. But the appearance of prominent advisers proves nothing other than the willingness of the board to throw money at a problem and the willingness of advisory firms to accept generous fees". The report added that "by the end, a whole suite of advisers, including an array of law firms, were squeezing fee income out of what remained of the company. £6.4m disappeared on the last working day alone as the directors pleaded for a taxpayer bailout". Rachel Reeves, the Labour MP who chaired the Commons business committee, said that after the accountancy firms "it was Carillion's legal advisers who took the big payouts in the company’s dying days".

Notable clients and cases 
 During the 2007–2008 Financial Crisis, the firm advised HM Treasury with recapitalising and stabilising UK Banks.
 During the COVID-19 pandemic, the firm advised HM Treasury on the government's emergency corporate covid financing facility (CCFF). The CCFF is intended to purchase commercial paper, a debt instrument, from companies in order to boost their liquidity.
 The firm advised the now liquidated British multinational construction company Carillion on asset sales, rescue bids and restructuring.
 In 2019, the firm advised Prudential plc and M&G plc on the demerger of M&G from Prudential.
 The firm advised New England Sports Ventures (now Fenway Sports Group) in their £300m takeover of Liverpool F.C.
 The firm advised GlaxoSmithKline on its high-profile joint venture with Novartis. The transaction received the 2015 Deal of the Year award by Financial News.

Attorneys and alumni 
Steve Edge
Alan Grieve
Giles Henderson
Simon Clarke
Ivo Stourton
Chris Jenkins
Seema Kennedy
Charles Randell
William Watson
David Green

See also
List of largest law firms by profits per partner

References

External links
Official website

Law firms of the United Kingdom
Law firms established in 1889
Companies based in the London Borough of Islington
Foreign law firms with offices in Hong Kong
1889 establishments in England
British companies established in 1889